Oh, My Darling is the debut album by Canadian singer-songwriter Basia Bulat. It was recorded in Montreal and produced by Howard Bilerman, whom Bulat met in 2006 and asked to work with. It was originally released April 30, 2007 on Rough Trade Records in the United Kingdom. It then saw a Canadian release June 4, 2007 on Hardwood Records, the vanity label of fellow Canadian musician Hayden. On February 5, 2008, the album was released on Rough Trade Records in the United States.

The album was a nominee for the 2008 Polaris Music Prize.

Track listing
 "Before I Knew" - 1:12
 "I Was a Daughter" - 2:54
 "Little Waltz" - 2:52
 "December" - 2:49
 "Snakes and Ladders" - 3:09
 "Oh, My Darling" - 1:23
 "In the Night" - 3:00
 "Little One" - 3:18
 "Why Can't It Be Mine" - 3:30
 "The Pilgriming Vine" - 4:36
 "La-Da-Da" - 3:18
 "Birds of Paradise" - 4:09
 "A Secret" - 2:06

References

2007 debut albums
Basia Bulat albums
Rough Trade Records albums
Albums produced by Howard Bilerman